St. Margaret Bay is a natural bay off the island of Newfoundland in the province of Newfoundland and Labrador, Canada. It is located on the northwest coast of Newfoundland's Great Northern Peninsula.

References

Bays of Newfoundland and Labrador